Afurino is a rural locality (a village) in Yudinskoye Rural Settlement, Velikoustyugsky District, Vologda Oblast, Russia. The population was 12 as of 2002.

Geography 
Afurino is located 10 km northwest of Veliky Ustyug (the district's administrative centre) by road. Gorka is the nearest rural locality.

References 

Rural localities in Velikoustyugsky District